Rambutan (taxonomic name: Nephelium lappaceum) is a medium-sized tropical tree in the family Sapindaceae. The name also refers to the edible fruit produced by this tree. The rambutan is native to Southeast Asia. It is closely related to several other edible tropical fruits including the lychee, longan, pulasan and guinep.

Etymology
The name "rambutan" is derived from the Malay word rambut meaning 'hair' referring to the numerous hairy protuberances of the fruits, together with the noun-building suffix -an. Similarly, in Vietnam, they are called chôm chôm (meaning 'messy hair').

Origin and distribution 
The center of genetic diversity for rambutans is the Malaysian−Indonesian region. They have been widely cultivated in southeast Asia areas, such as Malaysia, Thailand, Myanmar, Sri Lanka, Indonesia, Singapore, and the Philippines. It has spread from there to parts of Asia, Africa, Oceania and Central America.

Around the 13th to 15th centuries, Arab traders, who played a major role in Indian Ocean trade, introduced rambutans to Zanzibar and Pemba of East Africa. There are limited rambutan plantings in some parts of India. In the 19th century, the Dutch introduced rambutans from their colony in Southeast Asia to Suriname in South America. Subsequently, the plants spread to tropical Americas, planted in the coastal lowlands of Colombia, Ecuador, Honduras, Costa Rica, Trinidad and Cuba. In 1912, rambutans were introduced to the Philippines from Indonesia. Further introductions were made in 1920 (from Indonesia) and 1930 (from Malaya), but until the 1950s its distribution was limited.

There was an attempt to introduce rambutans to the Southeastern United States, with seeds imported from Java in 1906, but the species proved to be unsuccessful, except in Puerto Rico.

Description 
The leaves are alternate, 14–30 cm long, pinnate, with three to 11 leaflets, each leaflet 5–15 cm wide and 3–10 cm broad, with an entire margin.

The flowers are small, 2.5–5 mm, apetalous, discoidal and borne in erect terminal panicles 15–30 cm wide. Rambutan trees can be male (producing only staminate flowers and, hence, produce no fruit), female (producing flowers that are only functionally female) or hermaphroditic (producing flowers that are female with a small percentage of male flowers).

Fruit 
The fruit is a round to oval single-seeded drupe, 3–6 cm (rarely to 8 cm) long and 3–4 cm broad, borne in a loose pendant cluster of 10–20 together. The leathery skin is reddish (rarely orange or yellow) and covered with fleshy pliable spines, hence the name, which means 'hairs'. The spines (also known as "spinterns") contribute to the transpiration of the fruit, which can affect the fruit's quality.

The fruit flesh, the aril, is translucent, whitish or very pale pink, with a sweet, mildly acidic flavor reminiscent of grapes.

The single seed is glossy brown, 1–1.3 cm, with a white basal scar. Soft and containing equal portions of saturated and unsaturated fats, the seed may be cooked and eaten, but is bitter and has narcotic properties.

Pollination 
Aromatic rambutan flowers are highly attractive to many insects, especially bees. Flies (Diptera), bees (Hymenoptera) and ants (Solenopsis) are the main pollinators. Among the Diptera, Lucilia spp. are abundant and among the Hymenoptera, honey bees (Apis dorsata and A. cerana) and the stingless bee genus Trigona are the major visitors. A. cerana colonies foraging on rambutan flowers produce large quantities of honey. Bees foraging for nectar routinely contact the stigma of female flowers and gather significant quantities of the sticky pollen from male blossoms. Little pollen has been seen on bees foraging female flowers. Although male flowers open at 06:00, foraging by A. cerana is most intense between 07:00 and 11:00, tapering off rather abruptly thereafter. In Thailand, A. cerana is the preferred species for small-scale pollination of rambutan. Its hair is also helpful in pollination where pollen can be hooked on and transported to female flowers.

Production 

Rambutan is a fruit tree cultivated in humid tropical Southeast Asia. It is a common garden fruit tree and propagated commercially in small orchards. It is one of the best-known fruits of Southeast Asia and is also widely cultivated elsewhere in the tropics including Africa, southern Mexico, the Caribbean islands, Costa Rica, Honduras, Panama, India, Vietnam, Philippines, and Sri Lanka. It is also produced in Ecuador where it is known as achotillo, and on the island of Puerto Rico.

, Thailand was the largest producer of rambutans, growing 450,000 tonnes, followed by Indonesia at 100,000 tonnes, and Malaysia, 60,000 tonnes. In Thailand, major cultivation centers are Chanthaburi Province, followed by Chumphon Province and Surat Thani Province. In Indonesia, the production center of rambutan is in the western parts of Indonesia, which includes Java, Sumatra, and Kalimantan. In Java, the orchards and pekarangan (habitation yards) in the villages of Greater Jakarta and West Java have been known as rambutan production centers since colonial era, with a trading center in Pasar Minggu, South Jakarta.

During 2017 and years before, imports of rambutan to the European Union were about 1,000 tonnes annually, enabling a year-round supply from numerous tropical suppliers.

The fruits are usually sold fresh and have a short shelf-life, and are commonly used in making jams and jellies, or canned. Evergreen rambutan trees with their abundant colored fruit make attractive landscape specimens.

In India, rambutan is imported from Thailand, as well as grown in Pathanamthitta District of the southern state of Kerala.

Rambutans are not a climacteric fruit — that is, they ripen only on the tree and appear not to produce a ripening agent, such as the plant hormone ethylene, after being harvested. However, at post-harvest, the quality of the fruit is affected by storage factors. Low humidity levels, storage time, and incidences of mechanical damage can severely affect the quality of the fruit which would negatively affect the demand for such. In general, the fruit has a short shelf life in ambient conditions but implementing methods that can extend such is a productional advantage. Certain treatments like irradiation and the use of hot-forced air can help in fruit preservation although the former has seen more success.

Cultivation
Rambutans are adapted to warm tropical climates, around 22–30 °C, and are sensitive to temperatures below 10 °C. It is grown commercially within 12–15° of the equator. They grow on hilly terrain where there is good drainage. 

Rambutans are propagated by grafting, air-layering, and budding. Budded trees may fruit after two to three years with optimum production occurring after eight to 10 years. Trees grown from seed bear after five to six years.

The aril is attached to the seed in some commercial cultivars, but "freestone" cultivars are available and in high demand. Usually, a single light brown seed is found, which is high in certain fats and oils (primarily oleic acid and arachidic acid) valuable to industry, and used in cooking and the manufacture of soap. Rambutan roots, bark, and leaves have various uses in traditional medicine and in the production of dyes.

In some areas, rambutan trees can bear fruit twice annually, once in late fall and early winter, with a shorter season in late spring and early summer. Other areas, such as Costa Rica, have a single fruit season, with the start of the rainy season in April stimulating flowering, and the fruit is usually ripe in August and September. The fragile fruit must ripen on the tree, then they are harvested over a four- to seven-week period. The fresh fruit are easily bruised and have a limited shelf life. An average tree may produce 5,000–6,000 or more fruit (60–70 kg or 130–155 lb per tree). Yields begin at 1.2 tonnes per hectare (0.5 tons/acre) in young orchards and may reach 20 tonnes per hectare (8 tons per acre) on mature trees. In Hawaii, 24 of 38 cultivated hectares (60 of 95 acres) were harvested producing 120 tonnes of fruit in 1997. Yields could be increased by improved orchard management, including pollination, and by planting high-yielding compact cultivars.

Most commercial cultivars are hermaphroditic; cultivars that produce only functionally female flowers require the presence of male trees. Male trees are seldom found, as vegetative selection has favored hermaphroditic clones that produce a high proportion of functionally female flowers and a much lower number of flowers that produce pollen. Over 3,000 greenish-white flowers occur in male panicles, each with five to seven anthers and a nonfunctional ovary. Male flowers have yellow nectaries and five to seven stamens. About 500 greenish-yellow flowers occur in each hermaphroditic panicle. Each flower has six anthers, usually a bilobed stigma, and one ovule in each of its two sections (locules). The flowers are receptive for about one day, but may persist if pollinators are excluded.

In Thailand, rambutan trees were first planted in Surat Thani in 1926 by the Chinese Malay K. Vong in Ban Na San. An annual rambutan fair is held during August harvest time.

In Malaysia, rambutan flowers from March to July and again between June and November, usually in response to rain following a dry period. Flowering periods differ for other localities. Most, but not all, flowers open early in the day. Up to 100 flowers in each female panicle may be open each day during peak bloom. Initial fruit set may approach 25 percent, but a high abortion level contributes to a much lower level of production at harvest (1 to 3 percent). The fruit matures 15–18 weeks after flowering.

Rambutan cultivation in Sri Lanka mainly consists of small home gardens. Malwana, a village in the Kelani River Valley, is popular for its rambutan orchards. Their production comes to market in May, June, and July, when it is very common to observe seasonal traders along the streets of Colombo. Sri Lanka also has some off-season rambutan production in January and February in areas such as Bibile, Medagama, and Monaragala.

Both male and female flowers are faintly sweet-scented and have functional nectaries at the ovary base. Female flowers produce two to three times more nectar than male flowers. Nectar sugar concentration ranges between 18–47 percent and is similar between the flower types. Rambutans are an important nectar source for bees in Malaysia.

Cross-pollination is a necessity because the anther is absent in most functionally female flowers. Although apomixis may occur in some cultivars, rambutans, like lychee, are dependent upon insects for pollination. In Malaysia, where only about one percent of the female flowers set fruit, no fruit is set on bagged flowers while hand pollination resulted in a 13 percent fruit set. Pollinators may maintain a fidelity to either male or hermaphroditic flowers (trees), thus limiting pollination and fruit set under natural conditions where crossing between male and female flowers is required.

Cultivars
Well over 200 cultivars were developed from selected clones available throughout tropical Asia. Most of the cultivars are also selected for compact growth, reaching a height of only 3–5 m for easier harvesting.

Compared to propagated rambutan clones, rambutans taken from the wild have a higher acidity and potential for various food purposes. In Indonesia, 22 rambutan cultivars were identified with good quality, with five as leading commercial cultivars: 'Binjai', 'Lebak Bulus', 'Rapiah', 'Cimacan' and 'Sinyonya', with other popular cultivars including 'Simacan', 'Silengkeng', 'Sikonto' and 'Aceh kuning'. In the Malay peninsula, commercial varieties include 'Chooi Ang', 'Peng Thing Bee', 'Ya Tow', 'Azimat', and 'Ayer Mas'.

In Nicaragua, a joint World Relief–European Union team distributed seedlings to organizations such as Ascociación Pueblos en Acción Comunitaria in 2001 to more than 100 farmers. Some of these farmers saw the first production of rambutans from their trees in 2005–2006 with development directed at the local market.

In the Philippines, two cultivars of rambutans are distinguished by their seed. The common rambutan seed and fruit are difficult to separate, while the 'Maharlika Rambutan' fruit separates cleanly from its seed. The fruit taste and size of these two cultivars are identical, but the 'Maharlika Rambutan' is more popular with a higher price.

Nutrients and phytochemicals
Rambutan fruit is 78% water, 21% carbohydrates, 1% protein, and has negligible fat (table; data are for canned fruit in syrup; raw fruit data are unpublished). In terms of nutritional content, the canned fruit contains only manganese at a moderate level (16% of the Daily Value), while providing 82 calories in a 100 gram reference amount (table). Other micronutrients are at a low level.

As an unpigmented fruit flesh, rambutan does not contain significant polyphenol content, but its colorful rind displays diverse phenolic acids, such as syringic, coumaric, gallic, caffeic, and ellagic acids. Rambutan seeds contain equal proportions of saturated and unsaturated fatty acids, where arachidic (34%) and oleic (42%) acids, respectively, are highest in fat content.

The pleasant fragrance of rambutan fruit derives from numerous volatile organic compounds, including beta-damascenone, vanillin, phenylacetic acid, and cinnamic acid.

Gallery

See also 
 List of culinary fruits
 Pomology
 Pulasan

References

Edible fruits
Fruits originating in Asia
Medicinal plants
Trees of Thailand
Trees of Malesia
Tropical fruit
Nephelium
Fruit trees